The de Pischoff 1907 biplane  was a French experimental aircraft designed by Alfred de Pischoff in 1907. It is notable for being the first known example of a tractor biplane. It was built by Lucien Chauvière, later known for his laminated wood propellers.

Design and development
de Pischoff had previously experimented with a biplane glider derived from Ferdinand Ferber's Type VI of 1904, and some elements of the earlier machine may have been used for the 1907 machine. This was an unequal-span, single bay biplane powered by a 25 hp (18 kW) Anzani engine mounted in the middle of the gap between the wings. Booms carried the aft-mounted elongated triangular fin and horizontal stabiliser, with rectangular rudder and elevator. It was mounted on a tricycle undercarriage with two front wheels below the wings' leading edge and a third aft of the trailing edge.

Flight trials at Issy-les-Moulineaux in November 1907 were largely unsuccessful, although a flight of 500 metres was made on 17 December <ref>Progress of Mechanical Flight [[Flight International|Flight]], 2 January 1909, p. 12</ref> and after the aircraft was damaged in an accident it was abandoned. De Pischoff did not attempt to develop the design and the next aircraft he built was a tandem seat monoplane designed in collaboration with Paul Koechlin.

Specifications

Notes

References

Gibbs-Smith, C.H. Aviation: An Historical Survey London: NMSI, 2003. 
 Opdycke, L French Aeroplanes Before the Great War''  Atglen, PA: Schiffer, 1999 

1900s French experimental aircraft
Aircraft first flown in 1907
Biplanes
Single-engined tractor aircraft